Børre Sæthre (b. 1967 in Oslo, Norway) is a Norwegian artist whose exhibitions combine many skills, including those of the architect, the interior designer and the set dresser. His installations comprise interconnected environments that take the visitor into a fantastic, dreamlike universe which is both aesthetically pleasing and psychologically disquieting. 

In 1996, he launched LUSTLUX, under which his spatial environments (incorporating walls, furniture, light, sound, and different props) are produced. The rooms, corridors, pits and dark corners take you into another world, an enigmatic labyrinth populated by unlikely juxtapositions of stuffed animals, furniture and environmental sculptures, with carefully controlled lighting, recorded sound and music, video, living plants, motorized walls and sliding doors.

In the past, Sæthre has spoken of his fascination with Freud's concept of "the uncanny". So instead of trying to shock his media-saturated audience, he draws visitors into active participation in his synthetic dreamlike worlds and gives them a true taste of the uncanny.

Sæthre lives and works in Berlin and Oslo. He is represented by Galerie Loevenbruck, Paris, France

Academic
His academic career has been:
2008 Residency at Cité internationale des arts in Paris
2001–2002: Residency at the Kunstlerhaus Bethanien, Berlin, Germany
1999–2000: Residency at the ISCP (International Studio and Curatorial Program), New York, USA
1997–1998: Master Studio, National Academy of Fine Arts, Oslo, Norway
1992–1996: National Academy of Fine Arts, Oslo, Norway

Solo exhibitions
 1997 - Double Fantasy The Pasolini Experience and some Paranormal Activities, Künstlerhaus Bethanien, Berlin
 1997 - The Beautiful Ones Hurt You Every Time, Fotogalleriet, Oslo, Norway
 1997 - The Steps in Between, Hordaland Kunstnersentrum, Bergen, Norway
 1997 - (09-09 / 14-10) - Lustlux, Lustlux Corp, Oslo
 1999 - A million dreams, a million scars, Galerie Wang, Oslo
 2000 - (09-09 / 12-10) - Module for Mood, Theard Waxing Space, New York City
 2001 - (31-03 / 24-06) - My Private Sky, Astrup Fearnley Museum of Modern Art, Oslo
 2003 - Catch Me and Let Me Die Wonderful, Quarantine Series, Amsterdam, Netherlands
 2003 - The Lustlux Years - Galerie Wang, Oslo, Norway
 2003 - Untitled 5.0' (Selected Memories: Fragments, Sketches and Ideas From the Lustlux-years), Lydmar hotel, Stockholm, Sweden
 2005 - (10-11 / 14-01) - Powered by zero (The end of the BAMBI cycle) - Galerie Loevenbruck, Paris
 2005 - (23-11 / 15-01) - Autonomic High (the things I can't control, no matter how I try) - FRAC Caen, Lower Normandy
 2006 - (11-09 / 15-10) - I've been guilty of hanging around - Participant Inc, New York
 2007 - (25-05 / 19-08) - For Someone Who Nearly Died But Survived - Bergen Kunsthall, Bergen, Norway
 2008 - (01-01 / 25-05) - Kunsthallen Brandts Klædefabrik, Odense, Denmark
 2008 - Opening October 19 - P.S.1 Contemporary Art Center, New York, USA
 2009 - (07-05 / 20/06) - All Passion Spent (Death and Dark Forests) - Galerie Loevenbruck, Paris
 2010 - (19/06 / 26/06) - 2010 N.N (Nothing left // ) - Galleri NordNorge, Harstad, Norway

References

External links
Børre Sæthre at P.S.1 Contemporary Art Center / MoMA, New York, USA Video at VernissageTV.

Norwegian artists
Living people
Artists from Oslo
1967 births